The 2009 Finlandia Trophy was the 14th edition of an annual senior-level international figure skating competition held in Finland. It was held at the Valtti Areena in Vantaa between October 8 and 11, 2009. Skaters competed in the disciplines of men's singles, ladies' singles, and ice dancing.

Results

Men

Ladies

Ice dancing

External links
 2009 Finlandia Trophy results
 

2009
Finlandia Trophy
Finlandia Trophy